Mary Pilling (born 14 December 1938) is an English former cricketer who played primarily as a right-arm pace bowler. She appeared in 11 Test matches and 9 One Day Internationals for England between 1963 and 1978, and captained England at the 1978 World Cup. She played domestic cricket for Kent.

References

External links
 
 

1938 births
Living people
Cricketers from Cheshire
England women Test cricketers
England women One Day International cricketers
Kent women cricketers